Wacker Thun is a handball club from Thun, Switzerland. Wacker Thun competes in Nationalliga A of the Swiss Handball League.

Kits

Achievements
1 EHF Challenge Cup: 2005
2 Swiss Handball League: 2013, 2018
3 Swiss Cup: 2002, 2006, 2012

European record

2012/13 Team

External links
 
 

Swiss handball clubs
Thun
Handball clubs established in 1976
1976 establishments in Switzerland